Tom Masella (born July 11, 1959) is an American football coach and former player.  He is the head football coach at Wagner College, a position he has held since 2020. Massella served as the head football coach at Boston University from 1996 to 1997, Central Connecticut State University from 2004 to 2005, and Fordham University from 2006 to 2007.

After serving as an assistant at Wagner College, the United States Merchant Marine Academy, and Boston University, Masella became the first head coach of the Fairfield University football team. He left prior to their first game to return to Boston University, thus was the only coach at Fairfield who never coached a game. Masella coached BU to a 2–20 over two seasons before the university dropped football.

After BU, Masella was an assistant at the University of Connecticut, Louisiana Tech University, and UMass before becoming the head coach at Central Connecticut State University.  Masella left Central Connecticut State to become head coach at Fordham. In 2007, his second season at Fordham, he led the Rams to an 8–4 record, the Patriot League championship, and a spot in the NCAA FCS playoffs.

Head coaching record

References

External links
 Wagner profile
 Bryant profile
 Fordham profile

1959 births
Living people
American football defensive backs
Boston University Terriers football coaches
Bryant Bulldogs football  coaches
Central Connecticut Blue Devils football coaches
UConn Huskies football coaches
Fairfield Stags football coaches
Fordham Rams football coaches
Louisiana Tech Bulldogs football coaches
Merchant Marine Mariners football coaches
UMass Minutemen football coaches
Wagner Seahawks football coaches
Wagner Seahawks football players
Sportspeople from Staten Island
Players of American football from New York City